KJOX (1340 AM) is a radio station broadcasting a sports format. Located in Kennewick, Washington, United States, the station serves the Tri-Cities, Washington area. The station is owned by Stephens Media Group and features programming from ESPN Radio, ESPN Seattle,  and Westwood One.

References

External links

JOX
Sports radio stations in the United States
Radio stations established in 1945
1945 establishments in Washington (state)